Somerford Booths is a civil parish in Cheshire East, England. It contains five buildings that are recorded in the National Heritage List for England as designated listed buildings.  Of these, one is listed at Grade II*, the middle grade, and the others are at Grade II.  The parish is almost entirely rural, and the listed buildings consist of country houses, farmhouses and a farm building.

Key

Buildings

References

Citations

Sources

 

Listed buildings in the Borough of Cheshire East
Lists of listed buildings in Cheshire